Chhapahile  is a village and municipality in Gulmi District in the Lumbini Zone of central Nepal. At the time of the 1991 Nepal census it had a population of 2395 persons living in 441 individual households.

References

External links
UN map of the municipalities of Gulmi District

Populated places in Gulmi District